Helloworld Travel is an Australian-based travel agency specialising in Retail, Corporate and Wholesale travel products and packages. Helloworld Travel is the retail travel business of Helloworld Travel Limited (HLO), with fully branded travel agencies and associate agents located throughout Australia and New Zealand.

History 
Helloworld Travel was previously known as "Helloworld". The organisation has been through a series of mergers and acquisitions in recent history, amalgamating existing organisations within its parent company Helloworld Travel Limited. 

During the re-brand, the size of the network decreased by 9 per cent in 2014 and 2 per cent in 2015 due to franchisees being unhappy with the decision.

Controversies 
In February 2019 media reports revealed that Helloworld had paid for Australian Finance Minister Mathias Cormann's flights for a family holiday to Singapore in 2017, within weeks of two Helloworld subsidiaries being awarded contracts to arrange around AUD$1 billion worth of airline and hotel bookings for the Australian government over three years. Reports further revealed that the Australian Ambassador to the USA, Joe Hockey, had in April 2017 told Washington embassy staff to meet with an executive from Helloworld. Shortly afterwards, an email from former Helloworld executive Russell Carstensen was tabled in the Australian Senate. The email stated that Helloworld CEO, Andrew Burnes, told him he was able to arrange a meeting on very short notice because Hockey 'owes' him.

The Senate was also told that the senior Finance department official in charge of negotiating a new contract with Helloworld, John Sheridan, was moved from his role in July 2017, after Burnes had complained to Senator Cormann and then to the Finance Department head about Sheridan's team's emphasis on savings from the travel contract. Burnes is Treasurer of, and a significant donor to, the Liberal Party of Australia, Hockey and Cormann's party.

Operations 
Helloworld Travel has more than 2,000 travel agents in its retail network around Australia and New Zealand. As at June 30, 2018, the retail network had 2,223 members in Australia and New Zealand.

Helloworld Travel uses a franchise model, whereby franchisees are running their own small to medium business looking after their own business leasing, staffing, community marketing and brand marketing.

Australian Retail Operations 
In Australia, the Helloworld Travel network consists of fully branded franchise outlets, Associates, Helloworld Business Travel, Magellan Travel, MTA and My Travel Group.

Helloworld Travel is a member of the Franchise Council of Australia, and one of only two travel networks registered in Australia. With franchisees and independent affiliated travel agents, it is the largest independent agent network in Australia.

New Zealand Retail Operations 

In New Zealand, the helloworld network has not changed their branding alongside the Australian operations, and remains as helloworld. The network is made up of fully branded outlets, My Travel Group and The Travel Brokers.

Television series 
In 2018, Helloworld Travel Limited produced and launched the travel television series Helloworld in conjunction with the Nine Network Australia. The series promotes the Helloworld Travel retail network and its agents, through deals featured that are exclusive to the network.

In October 2019, the television series moved across to the Seven Network.

Awards and recognition 
2014 - Best Travel Agency Group, Australian Federation of Travel Agents (AFTA) National Travel Industry Awards (NTIA)

2016 - Best Travel Agency Group, Australian Federation of Travel Agents (AFTA) National Travel Industry Awards (NTIA)

2017 - Best Travel Agency Group, Australian Federation of Travel Agents (AFTA) National Travel Industry Awards (NTIA)

2018 - Best Travel Agency Brand, Travel Agents Association of New Zealand (TAANZ) National Travel Industry Awards (NTIA)

References

External links
 Helloworld Travel website
 Helloworld NZ website
 Helloworld Travel Limited website
 Helloworld Business Travel website
 Helloworld TV show official website
 Helloworld - IMDb

Companies based in Sydney
Travel agencies
Travel and holiday companies of Australia